Enabled.in is an online accessible information website for people with various disabilities.

Founded in 2009, it was one of the Tenth Planet Open Source Foundation (TPOSF) social venture initiatives. Enabled provides up-to-date accessible information for disabilities on assistive products, jobs, schemes education, organization, disability events, success stories, various schemes, and disability journals.

Getting a much greater response from various disability event organizers, NGOs, Government, and individuals with disabilities helps Enabled.in to grow constantly and become India's large online accessibility portal for networking and sharing among individuals and various organizations.

Enabled was built under guidelines of WCAG 2.0 with Schema.org content structure.

Awards 
 Best Accessible Website 2015 from Government of India 
 NCPEDP-Mphasis Universal Design Awards 2016

References

External Links 
 enabled.in

Disability websites